This is a year-by-year list of aviation accidents that have occurred at airshows worldwide in the 20th century.

2000
 August 18 – Airbourne 2000 show (Eastbourne, East Sussex, England) – former Red Arrows pilot Ted Girdler was killed when his Aero L-29 Delfín jet failed to pull up from a diving roll and crashed into the English Channel.
 June 18 – Willow Grove 2000 Sounds of Freedom Air Show (Willow Grove, Pennsylvania) – Two crew members of an F-14 Tomcat were killed when their aircraft lost altitude and crashed into a wooded area. They were demonstrating a low speed "landing wave-off maneuver" at the time of the accident.
 March 18 – Wings Over South Texas (Kingsville NAS, Texas) – Pilot Maj. Brison Phillips was killed when his F-16 Fighting Falcon crashed at an air show while thousands of horrified spectators watched.  Phillips had been attempting a Split S maneuver, in which the pilot rolls the airplane until it is upside down and then drops in a dive. The plane hit the ground and exploded, scattering debris for half a mile in a field about six miles north of the naval base about 12:45 p.m.

1999
 October 3 – California International Airshow (Salinas, California) – Pilot Wayne Handley was seriously injured when his custom built Turbo Raven crashed during maneuvers. The NTSB attributed the crash to pilot error, but Handley attributed it to an engine malfunction.
 September 18 – Reno Air Races (also known as National Championship Air Races) Pilot Gary Levitz, 61, a 30-year race veteran of Grand Prairie, Texas, was racing his highly modified Mustang P-51, which disintegrated during the Gold Unlimited race, scattering debris and damaging a house in Lemmon Valley, just east of the Stead Airport Base, where the races were being held. The NTSB had determined that the tail empennage failed in flight causing the aircraft to break apart.
 September 12 – Harriman-West Airport airshow – Both pilots were killed when a Cessna 337C and a Cessna 305C collided in midair while conducting in-trail fly-bys.
 July 29 – EAA Airventure airshow (Oshkosh, Wisconsin) – Pilot Laird Doctor was seriously injured when his F4U Corsair collided with a stationary F8F Bearcat during its takeoff roll. The Corsair crashed in flames beside the runway and was destroyed. Howard Pardue, the pilot of the Bearcat, was not seriously injured but his aircraft suffered major damage.
 June 12 – Paris Air Show (Paris, France) – A Russian Air Force Sukhoi Su-30MKI demonstrator '01' (with canards and vectored thrust), crashed at Le Bourget Airport. At the completion of a downward spiralling maneuver, the tail contacted the grass surface. With almost no forward speed the fighter was able to pull away from the ground, wings level, with an up pitch of 10–15 degrees and climb to ~150 feet (46 m), with the right jet nozzle deflected fully up and flames engulfing the left engine. Sukhoi test pilot Vyacheslav Averynov initiated ejection with navigator Vladimir Shendrikh departing the aircraft first. The Zvezda K-36D-3.5 ejection seats worked perfectly and both crew descended on to a taxiway unhurt. The Su-30 impacted some distance from the crew. The incident was captured on video.
 June 6 – Milan Rastislav Stefanik airport airshow (Bratislava, Slovakia) – Test pilot Graham Wardell was killed when his BAE Systems Hawk 200 failed to pull out of a low turn and struck the ground. A woman spectator was knocked off a nearby rooftop by the force of the explosion and died of her injuries.
 30 May – Airshow at Nowra, New South Wales, Australia. A vintage CAC Wirraway crashed during the display, killing pilot Owen O'Malley and observer Phil Lloyd.

1998
 August 15 – Swanton Morley Airshow (East Dereham, Norfolk, England) – Pilot Christopher Wilkins was killed when his Rollason D31 Turbulent stalled and crashed while performing with the Tiger Club display team.
 19 May – DARE Airshow (Manassas, Virginia) – Pilot Dr. Miles Merritt was killed when his Sukhoi Su-29 crashed while performing a skidding turn at too low an "altitude".
 March 1 – Mount Gambier Airshow (Mount Gambier, South Australia) – An Air Tractor AT-802A crashed on aerodrome whilst performing a low-level fire-fighting display. The pilot lost control after attempting a sudden steep climb at high speed and he was killed in the crash. There were no other casualties in the incident.

1997
 October 12 – (Duxford, Cambridgeshire, England) – The last airworthy World War II German Messerschmitt Bf 109 crashed while being flown by Air Chief Marshal Sir John Allison, Commander-in-Chief of RAF Strike Command. He was unhurt despite the plane coming to rest upside down. The plane, known to be difficult to land due to poor visibility from the cockpit and its narrow-track landing gear, had overshot the runway while landing following the malfunction of its Daimler-Benz DB 605 engine.
 September 20 – Sixth Annual Confederate Air Force Airshow (San Marcos, Texas) An Aerotek Pitts S-2A aerobatic biplane piloted by James Kincaid crashed at the bottom of a snap roll and dive maneuver in front of a crowd of approximately 15,000. The pilot died from his injuries later that day. Witnesses reported that the plane did not have sufficient airspeed at the start of the sequence to keep from crashing at the bottom of the dive.
 September 14 – Chesapeake Air Show (Middle River, Maryland) – A Lockheed F-117, 81–793, of the 7th Fighter Squadron, 49th Fighter Wing, at Holloman AFB, New Mexico, lost its port wing at 1500 hrs. during a pass over Martin State Airport, and crashed into a residential area of Bowley's Quarters, Maryland damaging several homes. Four people on the ground received minor injuries and the pilot, Maj. Bryan "B.K." Knight, 36, escaped with minor injuries after ejecting from the aircraft. A month-long Air Force investigation found that four of 39 fasteners for the wing's structural support assembly were apparently left off when the wings were removed and reinstalled in January 1996, according to a report released on December 12, 1997.
 July 26 – Ostend Airshow (Ostend, Belgium) – Captain Omar Hani Bilal of the Jordanian Air Force display team, the Royal Jordanian Falcons, was killed when he lost control of his Walter Extra EA300s. His plane crashed at the end of the runway and burst into flames near a Red Cross tent and spectator stands. On the ground, eight were killed and forty injured.
 June 22 – Wings Over Long Island Airshow – (Westhampton, New York) – Two planes racing collided over Francis S. Gabreski Airport in front of 15,000 spectators. Pilot Dick Goodlett died when his aircraft crashed and burst into flames. The second plane crash-landed, critically injuring pilot Chris Kalishek.
 June 1 – Air Show Colorado 1997 (Broomfield, Colorado) – Ret. Colonel "Smiling Jack" Jack M. Rosamond was killed when he lost control of his restored F-86 Sabre Jet during an acrobatic loop at the (then known as) Jefferson County Airport. Unseasonably high temperatures combined with the natural high elevation (5,673 ft) of the airport was thought to make the air less dense than expected, leading to poor effectiveness of flight control surfaces. Nobody else was injured in the accident.

1996
 September 14 – Bob Heale of Spokane was killed while performing at Spokane's Fairchild Air Force Base when his French CAP-10 crashed on its belly onto a dirt field in windy, rainy conditions at the annual Aerospace Days show. Investigators focused on possible mechanical problems with the 21-year-old plane. Bob Heale had been a regular performer at the Silverwood Theme Park in Athol, Idaho.
 August 4 – Three Rivers Regatta (Pittsburgh, Pennsylvania) – Pilot Clarence Speal was killed when the left hand wings on his biplane folded back which caused him to lose control and crash into the Ohio River.
 July 21 – Barton Aerodrome air show (Barton-upon-Irwell, Greater Manchester, England) – The last de Havilland Mosquito known to be airworthy (serial number RR299), a T Mk III built by D.H. at Leavesden in Spring 1945, crashed with the loss of both crew after suffering loss of engine power when performing a wing-over manoeuvre. The incident was captured on video.
 July 14 – Flying Legends Air Display (Duxford, Cambridgeshire, England) – Pilot Michael "Hoof" Proudfoot was killed when his Lockheed P-38 Lightning aircraft crashed and cartwheeled while performing a roll maneuver. Several aircraft on the ground were damaged or destroyed.
 June 2 – Bartlesville Biplane Exposition (Bartlesville, Oklahoma) – Two Biplanes clipped wings on landing, all four aboard killed: William Watson, 71; John Halterman, 51; Rodney Bogan, 41; and Annette Delahay, 45.
 4 May – Sertoma Cajun Air Festival (Lafayette, Louisiana) – Pilot Joe Hartung, 44, perished when the Canadian-built Harvard Mk. II he was flying hit the runway while performing a low altitude roll.
 April 27 – Shiloh Airshow (Stoneville, North Carolina) – Pilot Lindsey Hess escaped injury when his Pitts S2 A crashed inverted on the runway following his attempt to cut a ribbon with the plane.
 April 16 – EAA Sun 'n Fun (Lakeland, Florida) – Pilot Charlie Hillard was killed when his Hawker Sea Fury flipped over while landing in a crosswind.

1995
 September 9 – (Johannisthal, Germany) – A DASA-operated Messerschmitt Bf 108 Taifun, D-EFPT, crashed during an airshow, killing pilot Gerd Kahdemann and passenger Reinhard Furrer, a former astronaut who had flown in space for Germany in 1985 during the STS-61A mission aboard the Space Shuttle Challenger. After completing an aerobatic display, the Bf 108 was seen to climb and attempt an aileron turn with increased pitch which developed into a barrel-roll into the ground at a ~90-degree angle. A piece of the airframe that came loose while the aircraft was inverted was found to be the starboard wing leading edge slat.
 September 2 – Canadian International Air Show (Toronto, Ontario) – Seven Royal Air Force crew members were killed when their Hawker Siddeley Nimrod MR.2P stalled during a low altitude turn and crashed into Lake Ontario.

1994
 June 11 – Ray Mabery was killed at Selfridge Air National Guard Base in Mount Clemens, Michigan when his Canadair T-33 crashed during an unplanned roll.
 April 3 – Ian Reynolds died at a Warbirds Over Wanaka display in Wanaka, New Zealand when his de Havilland Canada DHC-1 Chipmunk 22A crashed after he misjudged the arch of his dive.

1993
 October 3 – Lanseria Air Show, Lanseria International Airport, Johannesburg, South Africa – Silver Falcon 5, an Atlas Impala Mk1 no 489 piloted by Charles Rudenick, crashed at Lanseria Airport after structural failure. The pilot initiated the ejection sequence half a second before impact. He came out horizontally with the fuselage vertical and a high downward velocity. He was killed when "sucked" into the crash fireball.
 August 22 – Prairie Air '93 Air Show – (Bloomington, Illinois) – A Pitts Special flown by Charlie Wells crashed while performing a Lomcevak. Wells was killed instantly when the plane hit the ground. No one on the ground was injured, and the airshow continued despite the accident, however no more aerobatic planes performed for the remainder of the day.
 August 8 – Stockholm Water Festival (Stockholm, Sweden) – A JAS 39 Gripen, 39102, crashed on the central Stockholm island of Långholmen, near the Västerbron bridge, during a slow speed manoeuver. Lars Rådeström, the same pilot as in the 1989 incident ejected safely. Despite large crowds standing by watching, no one on the ground was seriously injured. This crash was caused by a PIO.
 July 24 – Lebanon, New Hampshire – A biplane collided with a parachutist in the opening act of the Lebanon Airshow. Both the pilot and the parachutist died as a result of the collision. No other injuries were sustained.
 July 24 – Royal International Air Tattoo – (Fairford, Gloucestershire, England) – Two MiG-29s of the Russian Air Force "Test Pilots" aerobatic team collided in mid-air and crashed away from the public. No one was hurt on the ground, and both pilots (Alexander Beschastonov and Sergey Tresvyatsk) ejected safely. Investigators later determined that pilot error was the cause; one pilot did a reverse loop and disappeared into the clouds, the other one lost sight of his wingman and aborted the routine. The incident was captured on video.
 June 27 – Concord, New Hampshire – Ron Shelly and his daughter Karen Shelly Duggan, who performed a father daughter wing walking act, were killed when their plane crashed after failing to come out of a roll.
 2 May – (Marine Corps Air Station El Toro, California) – A vintage F-86 Sabre crashed and exploded in the middle of a runway after civilian pilot James A. Gregory failed to come out of a vertical loop several hundred feet in front of spectators. The impact killed the pilot and sent flaming debris along the runway. No one on the ground was injured. The incident was captured on video.

1992
 June 29 – Quad City Airshow (Davenport, Iowa) – An AV-8B Harrier leaving the airshow crashed on takeoff, killing pilot Maj. Jeffrey Smith.
 June 27 – Woodford Airshow (Woodford, Greater Manchester, England) – David Moore was killed when his Supermarine Spitfire Mk.XIV crashed into the runway at Woodford Aerodrome during a low level loop.
 April 5 – Valiant Air Command Warbird Air Show (Titusville, Florida) – Harry Doan 62, landed Skyraider taxied and went off the runway flipping in soft sand, nose end first crushing and killing pilot.

1991
August 11 – Byron's Original Aviation Expo (Ida Grove, Iowa) – Pilot Mack Stevens Orr, a member of the Confederate Air Force, died following the crash of his T-6 Texan during a reenactment of the bombing of Pearl Harbor.
August 5 – Northeast Flight '91 Airshow (Schenectady, New York) – Five crew members of a Canadian forces Sea King H-3 helicopter were injured when their craft lost altitude while hovering, crashed and flipped on its side.
June 23 – Quad City Air Show (Davenport, Iowa) – Pilot Rick Leonard was killed during an air race when the wing of his Monnett Sonerai I separated while making a turn.
June 22 – Redding Airshow, California. Pilot Gordy Drysdale, 43, of Stockton was killed when his T-34 failed to complete a low altitude roll and impacted the ground near spectators. Two were hospitalized in serious condition. A 34-year-old man suffered back injuries when hit by debris and a woman, 30, sustained several fractures as a result of the crash. Drysdale was the tail pilot of the four-member Brew Angels aerobatic team, which was performing a stunt called an end-tail roll.
26 May – Schofields Airport (Blacktown, New South Wales, Australia) – The pilot of a Bellanca Decathlon was killed when his aircraft stalled and crashed.

1990
 September 23 – (Baltimore County, Maryland) – 62-year-old pilot Jack B. Poage died after crashing his red-and-white Pitts S-2B during an air show at Martin State Airport after he added a fourth corkscrew maneuver to three that were expected during a nosedive. He pulled the aircraft out of the corkscrew but had insufficient altitude and the Pitts Special hit the ground on its belly. Carroll County Regional Airport, which he managed at the time, was given the additional name Jack B. Poage Field in his honor.
 September 16 – (Pápa, Hungary) – A Hungarian MiG-23MF "04" crashed during an aerobatic display. The pilot, Major Károly Soproni died.
 September 9 – (Salgareda, Italy) – A Soviet Su-27 coded "14 Red" crashed during an aerobatic display, killing its test pilot Rimantas Stankevičius.
 August 2 – (Oshkosh, Wisconsin) – pilot John Lewkowicz died after crashing his Boeing Stearman A75N-1 during an air show at the annual EAA National Convention Wittman Field. The aircraft was engaged in performing aerobatic maneuvers, entered a slow roll to the left, and at approximately the inverted position, the aircraft departed controlled flight. It then entered into an uncommanded snap roll to the left. The aircraft completed three-quarters of the roll, stopped in knife-edge flight and descended approximately 200 to 300 feet into the terrain.
 July 2 – Friendship Festival (Buffalo, New York) – Pilot Giff Foley was killed when his AT-6 lost altitude and crashed into the Niagara River.
 July 1 – National Capital Air Show (Ottawa, Ontario, Canada) – Harry E. Tope was killed when his P-51 Mustang crashed into a golf course.
 June 30 – Groton Air Show (Groton, Connecticut) – Russell Gage was killed while attempting to roll his aircraft on takeoff.
 June 17 – (Oklahoma City, US) – A small aircraft piloted by aerobatic champion Tom Jones crashed while performing during the Oklahoma City air show "Aerospace America." He was killed in the crash that was attributed to a low altitude stall.
 27 May – Memorial Day Air Show (Tuskegee, Alabama) – Pilot Albert Butler was killed while attempting a rollover at a low altitude.

1989
 October 8 – Indian Air Force Day (New Delhi, India) – Wing Commander Ramesh 'Joe' Bakshi of the Indian Air Force was killed when his Mirage 2000 crashed while performing a Downward Charlie (a series of downward rolls in the vertical plane, pulling out with wings level at a specific height). A dozen spectators were injured, one fatally, from the explosions and fire.
 September 3 – Canadian International Air Show (Toronto, Ontario) – Captain Shane Antaya, flying for the Canadian Forces Snowbirds team died after a mid-air collision during a demonstration when his Tutor crashed into Lake Ontario. During the same accident, team commander Major Dan Dempsey safely ejected from his aircraft.
 June 8 – Paris Air Show (Paris, France) – During a low-speed, high angle-of-attack portion of Mikoyan's test pilot Anatoly Kvochur's routine display flight, a bird sucked into the turbofan of his MiG-29's right engine caused it to malfunction. After steering the MiG away from spectators, Kvochur managed to eject from the MiG seconds before his aircraft hit the ground. The incident was captured on video.

1988
 September 5 – Farnborough Air Show (Farnborough, England) – A Soviet Antonov 124 suffered engine failure and aborted its takeoff.
 August 28 – Kleine Brogel Air Base (Peer, Belgium) Pilot Ari Piippo was killed when the Aermacchi M-290 RediGO he was demonstrating failed to come out of a spin.
 August 28 – Ramstein airshow disaster (Ramstein, (Germany)) – Three members of Italy's Frecce Tricolori Air Force Display Team flying Aermacchi MB-339's were involved in a mid-air collision. Three pilots, Lt. Col. Ivo Nutarelli, Lt. Col. Mario Naldini and Cap. Giorgio Alessio were killed, wreckage from the collision landed on the spectators, killing 31 people outright, mortally wounding 39 more and seriously injuring 346.
 August 7 – Leopoldsburg, Belgium – A Belgian Air Force pilot was killed when his Mirage 5 jet crashed at an air show organized by the Belgian Air Force.
 June 26 – Habsheim Airshow  (Mulhouse, Alsace, France) – While performing a gear down low speed pass, Air France Flight 296, a chartered Air France Airbus A320 lost altitude and crashed into a treeline. Three of the 136 persons aboard were killed. 
 31 May – Warwickshire Air Pageant (Baginton, England) – RAF Flight Lieutenant Peter Stacey was killed when his Meteor T.7 lost altitude and crashed during a descending turn. Lieutenant Stacey was said to have stayed with the aircraft and steered it away from a residential area prior to the crash.
April 24 – Marine Corps Air Station El Toro, California – Marine Corps Colonel Jerry Cadick, then commanding officer of MAG-11, was performing aerobatics before a crowd of 300,000 when he crashed his F/A-18 Hornet at the bottom of a loop that was too close to the ground. The aircraft was in a nose-high attitude, but still carrying too much momentum toward the ground when it impacted at more than 300 mph (480 km/h). Col. Cadick was subjected to extremely high G forces that resulted in his face making contact with the control stick, sustaining serious injuries. He broke his arm, elbow and ribs, exploded a vertebra and collapsed a lung. Col. Cadick survived and retired from the Marine Corps. The F/A-18 remained largely intact but was beyond repair.
April 11 – Sun 'N Fun Fly in Lakeland, Florida – Pilot Ron Cox was injured after making a hard landing due to an onboard fire that occurred during a stunt presentation.

1987
 September 6 – Mammoth Lakes Air Show – Civilian stunt pilot Gary Loundagin, 42, of Livermore, California, was killed when his vintage T-34B aircraft crashed, he had executed a loop maneuver with insufficient altitude for recovery. The aircraft impacted next to the runway but did not explode. The high elevation of the airport was probably not accounted for by Loundagin, contributing to the mishap.
 August 8 – Fairfield County Air Show, Lancaster, Ohio – Pilot James King was killed when his biplane crashed while performing at the air show.

1986
 June 28 – SHAPE International Air Show, Chièvres Air Base, Belgium – After hovering a Hawker Siddeley Harrier GR.3 with a rearward movement, parallel to the public line at about 200 meters of altitude, R.A.F. Flt. Lt. Brian D. Weatherley ended with a nose down attitude that seemed steeper than usual. The aircraft nose kept going down past a recoverable angle. The pilot ejected while the aircraft was pointing straight towards the ground, still roughly stationary. He hit the ground before his parachute opened and later died from injuries sustained in the ejection. The aircraft (XW769) fell to the ground without explosion, but was deemed unrecoverable.
 July 24 – RAF Brawdy Air Show, Wales UK. A US Phantom jet crashed into the sea off the coast. Eyewitness accounts at the time suggested something had fallen off the plane, before it rapidly headed for the sea, away from the crowds. The pilot and copilot both died. There were no injuries on the ground.
 26 May – Berlin Municipal Airport (Milan, New Hampshire) – Pilot Robert Weymouth, known as "The Flying Farmer", was killed when he failed to recover during a descent.
 26 May – Mildenhall Air Show (Mildenhall, Suffolk) – The crew of a RAF Meteor was killed following the mid air collision with a RAF Vampire. The crew of the Vampire was able to parachute to safety.

1985
 July 13 – Western New York Air Show '85 (Niagara Falls International Airport, New York) – Blue Angels Aircraft 5, BuNo 155029, and 6, BuNo 154992, both Douglas A-4F Skyhawks, collided at the top of a loop, killing Lt. Cmdr. Michael Gershon. The other pilot, Lt. Andy Caputi, ejected safely with only minor injuries. One Skyhawk crashed in the airport grounds while the second fighter fell onto a nearby auto junkyard. The demonstration team resumed their show duties on July 20 at Dayton, Ohio but omitted the maneuver that resulted in the crash, and flew with five planes rather than six.
 5 May – Lemoore Naval Air Station Air Show – Civilian stunt pilot Kirk R. McKee of Sacramento, California, stalled his AT6A "Texan" aircraft after recovering from a Reverse Cuban Eight maneuver at low altitude. The aircraft crashed in an inverted, nose down attitude and exploded.
 April 27 – An AT-6 crashed during an air show at the El Toro Marine Corps Air Station when it apparently lost power, snagged a power line, smacked into the street and then slid into the chapel, killing the pilot Merrel Richard Gossman, 55, and passenger Robert G. Arrowsmith, 25. No one on the ground was hurt.

1984
 November 11 – Fairview Fly-in and Air Show, Fairview, Oklahoma – Civilian stunt pilot Tom McGuire in a North American SNJ-5, North American T-6 Texan, registered N91047, was recovering from a left aileron roll, the aircraft nose dropped and the aircraft turned 45 degrees to the right of the runway heading, it then impacted the ground in a shallow dive with the right wing low, killing the pilot. No one on the ground was hurt.
 September 4 – A de Havilland Canada DHC-5D Buffalo plane, registered C-GCTC, was damaged beyond repair in an accident during the 1984 Farnborough Airshow. Following a STOL display, the aircraft performed a very steep descending right turn onto the threshold of the runway. Shortly before touchdown the rate of descent reduced slightly. The aircraft then landed very hard. The nose gear collapsed, both wings failed and the propellers disintegrated after contacting the runway. Debris caused some damage to vehicles and three aircraft in the static display area.
 August 12 – A PZL-104 Wilga, registered SP-AFX, was one of three Wilgas flying in formation at an airshow at Fairyhouse Racecourse. The aircraft were about to fly in front of the main stand when the aircraft stalled and crashed, killing the pilot, Jan Baran. There were no other fatalities.
 June 3 – Großostheim near Aschaffenburg, Germany – A Hawker Siddeley Harrier GR3 launched vertically for a demonstration flight in front of the audience. The landing gear was extended during the Harrier was hovering. Because of a leak in the fuel supply fuel dripped onto the landing gear and ignited. The engine was sucking up smoke and lost thrust. From a height of about 90feet the Harrier crashed next to the runway and burst into flames – around 100 feet away from the audience. The pilot was able to escape with the ejection seat but the falling seat killed a spectator.
 April 8 – Canary Islands Air Show (Canary Islands) – Pilot Augustin Gil de Montes lost control and crashed his Z-50 shortly after takeoff. He was killed along with four spectators and fourteen others were injured after his plane burst into flames and crashed through a barrier where the spectators were standing.

1983
September 11 – Plainview, Texas – The wings of a Partenavia P.68C separated from the root just outboard of the engine nacelles during a high-speed, high-G maneuver beyond the design parameters of the aircraft and plummeted to the ground, killing the pilot.
August 26 – Scarborough, UK – Lightning F3 XP753 stalled and crashed 200 yds from the shoreline, killing pilot Flt/Lt Mike Thompson whilst performing an unauthorised flying display at a seafront event.
July 31 – Experimental Aircraft Association (Oshkosh, Wisconsin) – Arlin Pestes was killed when his Van's Aircraft RV-3 lost altitude and crashed during a formation fly over.
July 9 – Gadsden Airport (Gadsden, Alabama) – Pilot Harry Claxton and passenger Dr. George Horn were killed when their Aeronca AR-7 dove and crashed while making a turn during a mock battle. It is believed that loose tools and missing cover boots caused the control yoke to jam causing the accident.
22 May – (Rhein-Main Air Base, Frankfurt, Germany) – A Canadian Forces CF-104 Starfighter, 104813, of 439 Sqn., departed controlled flight and exploded on impact on the B43 highway. The resulting fireball engulfed the car of priest Martin Jürges and killed three adults and two children. The sixth passenger in the car, Jürges' niece, died months later from her burns. A Canadian Forces spokesman said that the CF-104, flown by Capt. Alan J. Stephenson, 27, was in a formation of five Starfighters, and that he was to do a solo display. He had done two complete circuits and had leveled off for a low-speed fly-past when the plane malfunctioned. He ejected safely.
15 May – Barton Airfield (Manchester, England) – Stunt pilot Mike Watkins was killed when he lost control of his Jurca Gnatsum, entered a corkscrew spin, and crashed.

1982
November 14 – (Hamamatsu, Japan) – Captain Takashima Kiyoshi was killed and 12 spectators were injured when the Mitsubishi T-2B he was flying, as part of the Blue Impulse aerobatic demonstration team, failed to pull out of a vertical dive and crashed into a building.
All 46 aboard were killed. The crash was later found to be caused by an accumulation of ground walnut shells that had been used to clean the machinery.
16 May – Shelby County Air Show (Alabaster, Alabama) Pilot Don Smith was killed when his Piper J-3 Cub failed to pull out of a spin.
January 18 – (Indian Springs Air Force Auxiliary Field) – All 4 USAF Thunderbirds pilots were killed in the Diamond crash.

1981
9 May – (Hill Air Force Base, Utah) – A U.S. Air Force Thunderbirds Northrop T-38 Talon crashed while performing the Hi-Lo Maneuver, killing pilot Captain David "Nick" Hauck. Capt. Hauk, in Thunderbird 6, crashed while attempting to land his ailing T-38 after an engine malfunctioned and caught fire. With black smoke billowing from the exhaust and the aircraft losing altitude in a high nose-up attitude, the safety officer on the ground radioed Capt Hauck: "You’re on fire, punch out", to which he responded: “Hang on... we have a bunch of people down there”. The aircraft continued to fight to stay airborne for about half a mile before hitting a large oak tree and a barn, then sliding across a field and flipping as it traversed an irrigation canal ultimately erupting into a fireball just a few hundred feet from the runway's end. No one on the ground was injured even though the accident occurred adjacent to a roadway packed with onlookers.

1980
September 21 – Joliet Park District Airport (Joliet, Illinois) – Three United States Marine service members were killed and one injured when their Huey H-1 helicopter stalled and crashed when it pulled up from a low high speed pass.
September 21 – (Biggin Hill, London, England) – A Douglas A-26 Invader crashed during an air display. The aircraft was attempting to carry out a climbing roll in front of the crowd when the nose dropped sharply, and the aircraft continued rolling until it dropped vertically into a valley. The pilot and seven passengers were killed. The Civil Aviation Authority subsequently introduced rules preventing passengers from being carried during air displays.
June 15 – (Shannon Airport, Fredericksburg, Virginia) – Sgt. 1st Class Tom Johnson, a parachute jumper with the U.S. Army Golden Knights, fell over 10,000 feet to his death when both of his parachutes (main and reserve) failed to deploy.
April 17 – American Samoan Flag Day (Pago Pago, American Samoa) – The seven member crew of an American Navy P-3 Orion were killed when their plane struck a cable car wire, lost its right wing and tail, and cartwheeled into a local hotel causing a fire. Five hotel staff and one guest were injured in the accident which destroyed one wing of the hotel.
July 4 - John Pigford, 7, was killed in Willow Grove after accidentally activating an ejection seat.

1979
 27 May – Capt. Pier Gianni Petri of the Frecce Tricolori crashed and died at the RAF Mildenhall Airshow. Capt. Petri was flying a Fiat G91 which failed to recover from its dive during a "Bomb Burst" maneuver and crashed near the village of Beck Row. No one on the ground was injured during the accident.
 July 6 – Chicksands Royal Air Force Base (Chicksands, England) – An unidentified United States Air Force pilot was killed when his A-10A crashed while doing low-level aerobatics. It was reported that he stayed with his plane and steered it away from the crowds.
 August 3 - RNAS Yeovilton - A Marineflieger Lockheed F-104G Starfighter had just performed a flying display at the Fleet Air Arm Open Day at Yeovilton, and was turning from base leg to final approach when it stalled and crashed; KptLt Manfred Stürmer ejected too late and was killed.
 September 3 – (Dillon, Montana) – Captain Joel Rude, 32 years old, of Great Falls, Montana, was a flight training instructor for the Montana Air National Guard was killed when his U.S. Air Force F-106 Delta Dart from the 186th Fighter-Interceptor Squadron was making a low flight over a Labor Day parade on Dillon's main street, crashed into a grain elevator and exploded, killing the pilot and setting a bulk oil storage plant on fire. Much of the city's electrical power was knocked out, the police reported. At least eight other persons on the ground were injured, four of them severely enough to be admitted to hospitals.

1978
November 8 – One of the solo Skyhawks of the Blue Angels struck the ground after low roll during arrival maneuvers at NAS Miramar. Navy Lieutenant Michael Curtin was killed. The accident was caught on film.
August 12 – (Glenview, Illinois) – Avro Vulcan B2 XL390 of 617 Squadron Royal Air Force crashed during an air display at Naval Air Station Glenview, just north of Chicago. All four Royal Air Force crew members were killed. Their delta-winged bomber apparently stalled during a wing-over and then crashed into a landfill just north of Willow Road.
 3 May – (Grande Prairie, Alberta) – Captain Gordon de Jong of the Canadian Forces Snowbirds died when the horizontal stabilizer failed, rendering the aircraft uncontrollable. Although ejection was initiated, it was not successful.
February 25 – Dubbo Airshow (New South Wales, Australia) – Pilot Bryan Hindle was killed when his motorized hang glider crashed during an air show.

1977
 October 9 – Lanseria Airport, near Johannesburg, South Africa – Demonstration Pilot Peter Philips flying a Britten-Norman Trislander in flying display performed a second wing-over and had insufficient altitude to recover. Impacted the runway and bounced into the air and came to rest some 500m further off to the side of the runway. The flying controls were disabled and main gear detached. One wing engine detached. Philips was accompanied by Mike Wrigly – both survived with minor injuries although had to spend a few days in hospital. Aircraft written off.
September 23 – Suffolk Air Fair press preview (Westhampton Beach, New York) – Stunt pilot Edward H. Mahler was killed at Suffolk County Airport when the tail section of his biplane separated at an altitude of 300 feet. An hour before the accident he had repaired a loose strut on the tail section of his plane.
September 4 - Richmond, Indiana - Incident at 14:25 hours.  The damage was substantial.  Parachutist, John Steinemann, was pulled out of N4111A, a C-45 H Expeditor aircraft, and hit the tail and was killed.
September 2 – Canadian International Air Show (Toronto, Ontario, Canada) – Pilot Alan Ness was killed when his Fairey Firefly lost altitude and crashed in Lake Ontario while taking part in a formation flight.
 August 21 - Evergreen Airpark - Vancouver Washington. Stunt pilot Harry Eyerly was killed when his Pitts Special failed to recover from a spin.
June 3 – Paris Air Show (Paris, France) – Test pilot Howard W. "Sam" Nelson was killed when his A-10 Thunderbolt II crashed after coming out of a loop at low altitude.
15 May – Biggin Hill Air Show (Biggin Hill, London, England) – Five persons were killed and one injured when a sightseeing helicopter struck the underside of a de Havilland Tiger Moth biplane at an altitude of 200 feet. The biplane, with "its undercarriage sheared off", was able to land safely with no injuries to the pilot or passenger.

1976
September 26 – Weyers Cave Air Show (Weyers Cave, Virginia) – Flight instructor Gerry Presson was killed when his plane stalled as he pulled out of a climb and crashed.
August 28 – Gathering of Warbirds (Fresno, California) – Pilot Cliff Anderson was killed when his home built Stolp Starduster I SA100 aerobatic biplane crashed and burned after he was unable to recover from an inverted spin.

1975
September 13 – Reno Air Races – M.D. Washburn, 40, of Houston, Texas, died when the wing of his North American T-6 Texan clipped a pylon and crashed while in a tight formation at the start of the race.
September 13 – Reno Air Races – While wing walking, Gordon McCollom of Costa Mesa, Calif. was hanging under a plane piloted by Joe Hughes. It suddenly dropped too close to the runway in what one official called a "freakish downdraft" and McCollom scraped his upper head on the runway, dying instantly. Hughes was able to regain control of the plane and land. The accident occurred directly in front of the grandstand just 15 minutes after Washburn's fatal accident. The accident was caught on film.
September 6 - RNAS Yeovilton - Flight Lieutenant Stephen Beckly RAF, died when getting out of his Harrier GR3 following a display at Fleet Air Arm Open Day, the ejector seat accidentally fired. He was thrown 30 ft in the air and died shortly after arriving at Yeovil Hospital.

1974
September 8 – South Weymouth Naval Air Station (Massachusetts) – A Bellanca 8KCAB N86589 crashed nearly vertically into the ground while performing a controlled, acrobatic, half-twist maneuver. Fire after impact. Misjudged altitude and clearance, killing its pilot.
September 1 – Farnborough Airshow (Hampshire, United Kingdom) – Co-pilot Stewart Craig was killed instantly and pilot Kurt Cannon died nine days after their Sikorsky S-67 Blackhawk helicopter crashed during low level maneuvers.
July 28 – General Mitchell International Airport (Milwaukee, Wisconsin) – United States Marine Captain Stephen Torrent suffered minor injuries after ejecting from his Hawker Harrier that dove and crashed while demonstrating vertical takeoffs.

1973
June 3 – Paris Air Show (Paris, France) – The first production Tupolev Tu-144 supersonic airliner crashed after it disintegrated in mid-air during a flight demonstration, killing all six on board and eight on the ground. The cause of the crash is controversial; factors cited include pilot error, mechanical failure and possible interference by a French aircraft sent up to photograph the Soviet airplane. A full investigative report was not released.
July 8 – Lake Charles, LA – Lt. Steve Lambert, flying a Blue Angels F-4J Phantom II s/n 153876, had a mechanical problem and had to eject from his aircraft during that Sunday's performance. Lt. Lambert survived with only minor scratches, his aircraft was destroyed.

1972
September 24 – Golden West Sport Aviation Show (Sacramento, California) – A privately owned F-86 Sabre jet piloted by Richard Bingham failed to take off while leaving the show. The jet went through a chain link fence at the end of the runway, across Freeport Boulevard, crushed a parked car and then crashed into a local Farrell's Ice Cream Parlour. Twenty-two people were killed, including twelve children and two people in the parked car.
 June 10 – Trenton Air Show at CFB Trenton, Ontario – Canadian air force Snowbirds solo Captain Lloyd Waterer died after a wingtip collision with the other solo aircraft while performing an opposing solo manoeuvre.
June 4 – Transpo 72 Airshow (Dulles International Airport) – U.S. Air Force Thunderbirds pilot Major Joe Howard, flying Thunderbird 3, F-4 Phantom II, 66-0321, lost power during a vertical maneuver, breaking out of formation just after completing a wedge roll at around  AGL. The aircraft staggered and descended in a flat attitude with little forward speed. Howard ejected and descended under a good canopy, but winds blew him into the ascending fireball from the crashed aircraft, melting his parachute; Howard plummeted  and sustained fatal injuries.
 June 3 – Transpo 72 Airshow (Dulles International Airport) –  In a sport plane pylon race when, during a turn around a pylon, a trailing aircraft's wing and propeller hit the tip of the right wing of a leading aircraft, shearing the leading aircraft's wing off the fuselage. The damaged aircraft crashed almost instantly, killing the pilot, professional Air Racer Hugh C. Alexander of Louisville, GA
 May 29 – Transpo 72 Airshow (Dulles International Airport) – The first accident of the air show involved a 'Kite Rider', i.e., a variety of hang glider that was being towed by a vehicle. The aircraft suffered a structural failure and collapsed, killing the pilot.

1971
August 22 – Seething, Norfolk – Pilot Neville Browning was killed while inverted during a "Flying Farmer" performance.
June 6 – Robertson Airfield (Plainville, Connecticut) – Pilot Gilbert Gillete was killed when his biplane entered a spin at low altitude.
June 5 – Quonset Point Air Show (Quonset Point, Rhode Island) – J.W. "Bill" Fornof flying an F8F Bearcat died after losing a wing to metal fatigue.

1970
September 26 – St. Paul, Minnesota – Mechanic Sgt. Foster G. Crump was killed and pilot Col. Robert Leighton was injured when their replica 1919 biplane crashed shortly after takeoff.
September 11 – Farnborough Air Show (Hampshire, UK) – A Wallis WA-117 Gyrocopter was being demonstrated at the Society of British Aerospace Companies (SBAC). After a high-speed downwind run parallel to the runway, the aircraft first pitched rapidly nose-up, then nose-down, and went out of control, the rotor blades striking the propeller, fin and rudder as it fell to the ground. The pilot was killed instantly.
August 30 – (Cedar Rapids, Iowa) – One of the members of the US Navy Blue Angels belly-landed at Eastern Iowa Airport with one engine stuck in afterburner. The pilot ejected safely, the aircraft ran off the runway.
June 27 – Woodford Airshow, Cheshire, UK - Hornet Gyrocopter crashed killing its pilot; rotor broke, smashing the rudder, so causing the gyrocopter to lose control.
February 15 – Wellsford Airstrip (Bendigo, Australia) – Pilot Donald Busch was killed when his P-51 Mustang crashed after it gained altitude and rolled over following a fly past of the show grounds.

1969
August 8 – Abbotsford Air Show (Abbotsford, British Columbia) – At noon a Boeing 747 airliner made its Canadian debut with a low flypast to open the first day of the three-day airshow. This was followed a few minutes later by an inverted pass of a much smaller aircraft along the same flight line. Nearing midfield the Mini Mustang N9N suddenly dove vertically into the ground killing the pilot, 20-year-old flight instructor Scott Nelskog from Washington State.
June 4 – Reading Air Show (Reading, Pennsylvania) – Captain Dick Schram, a Naval Reserve Aviator "billed as the Flying Professor", was killed when his Piper Cub failed to pull out of a dive during a comedy flying routine. His son, a public affairs officer with the United States Navy Blue Angels, was announcing the routine at the time of the crash.

1968
September 20 – Farnborough Air Show (Hampshire, England) – Six members of the French Air Force were killed when their Breguet 1150 Atlantic crashed while performing a single engine demonstration.
17 May – Armed Forces Day Air Show (Holloman Air Force Base, New Mexico) – A United States Air Force F-111 experienced a tailstrike and skidded to a stop 100 yards from 2,000 spectators while landing.

1967
October 21 – Thunderbirds F-100D piloted by Tony McPeak (14th Chief of Staff of the Air Force from 1990-1994) crashed at Laughlin AFB, Texas, United States. The accident occurred during the "Bomb Burst" maneuver when the solo aircraft piloted by McPeak shed its wings during a vertical rolling climb. The accident was attributed to failure of the wing structure due to fatigue. McPeak successfully ejected from the aircraft.
June 4 – A member of the Patrouille de France Display Team, died when his Fouga Magister went out of control during the display at the 1967 Paris Air Show at Le Bourget, France.

1966
September 2 – Canadian International Air Show (Toronto, Ontario) – US Navy Blue Angels pilot Lt. Cmdr. Dick Oliver was killed when he crashed his F-11 Tiger into a breakwater at Toronto Island Airport.
August 13 – Aviation Day (Amarillo Air Force Base, Texas) – Shelby M. Kritser, chairman of the Texas Aeronautics Commission, was killed when his F8F-2 Bearcat, N7826C, b/n 121699, crashed during an attempted hammerhead stall.
July 23 – Porter County Municipal Airport (Valparaiso, Indiana) – Stunt pilot Bill Adams was killed when the wing separated from his biplane during an outside snap roll.

1965
June 15 – Paris Air Show (Paris, France) – United States Air Force Lt Colonel Charles D. Tubbs was killed and two other crewmen injured when their B-58 Hustler bomber crashed. The plane landed short of the runway, struck the "instrument approach beacons" and burst into flames.

1964
September 13 – Farnborough Air Display, Farnborough, Hampshire, UK) – Bristol Bulldog Mk.IIA G-ABBB / `K2227' (registered new in 1930) crashed at the SBAC Farnborough show. After several slow loops at low altitude the engine cut out at the top of a loop, possibly due to magneto failure. The pilot had little chance of recovery and the aircraft crashed through the crowd barrier from the outside, the pilot, Ian Williamson, escaping with cuts and bruises.
9 May – (Hamilton AFB, California) – United States Air Force Capt. Eugene J. Devlin was killed when a Republic F-105B Thunderchief, 57-5801, Thunderbird 2, delivered to the US Air Force Thunderbirds demonstration team in April 1964, suffered structural failure and disintegrated during 6G tactical pitch-up for landing after an air display. The failure of the fuselage's upper spine caused the USAF to ground all F-105s and retrofit the fleet with a structural brace, but the air demonstration team reverted to the F-100 Super Sabre and never flew another show in F-105s.
 3 May – Armed Forces Day exhibition (Bremerhaven, Germany) – Major Thomas Eugene Perfili, an American flight instructor attached to the West German Air Force, was killed in the crash of his Starfighter after losing power while demonstrating rolls. He guided his plane away from spectators but was unable to eject.

1963
 September 9 – Kent Air Display (Rochester, England) – Pilot Neville Browning suffered minor injuries following the crash of his Tiger Moth aircraft.
 July 21 – Caselle Airport (Turin, Italy) – While skimming the ground during an airshow Italian Air Force pilot Mario Pisano struck a parked automobile, veered into a crowd of people killing one from the propeller and injuring three and finally struck an empty bus. He was not injured in the crash.
 July 14 – Naval Air Display (Lossiemouth, Scotland) The pilot of a Gannet aircraft was unhurt following a crash landing caused by an engine failure.
July 4 – Moline, Illinois – Skydiver John Talbott was killed and three others injured when their plane crashed during takeoff, in rainy conditions, while heading to perform during Fourth of July festivities.

1962
October 2 – Public Air Display, Sydney Harbor, Australia – Two De Havilland Sea Venoms of the Royal Australian Navy collided during an air display over the Harbor. Lieutenant Albert 'Albie' Riley ejected from his aircraft at only 500 feet and survived with minor injuries. His aircraft crashed into the water close to what would be the site of the Sydney Opera House. The second Venom piloted by Lieutenant B. Roberts, although badly damaged, managed to make it back to its base at Nowra.
September 3 – National Air Show (Chino, California) – Stunt pilot Cliff Winters was killed when his engine failed during a roll.
April 21 – Seattle World's Fair (Seattle, Washington) – Mr. and Mrs. Raymond Smith were killed in their residence after an F-102 fighter, that was part of a ten plane F-102 flyover for the opening ceremonies of the fair, suffered a flameout at 1,500 feet. The pilot safely ejected but the plane overshot Lake Washington, where the pilot intended to ditch the plane, and crashed in a residential neighborhood.

1961
September 24 – (Wilmington, North Carolina) – Three servicemen were killed and twelve survived when an Air Force C-123 Provider carrying members of the Army Golden Knights crashed and burned on take-off at an airshow.
June 3 – A United States Air Force Convair B-58 Hustler 58-2451, named The Firefly, crashed a few miles north of Paris during the 1961 Paris Air Show, all three on board were killed.

1959
December 5 – Palm Desert, California – All four occupants of a twin engine Beechcraft Bonanza were killed after the tail section of their aircraft was sheared off in a mid-air collision with a single engine Beechcraft during an air show. The single engine Beechcraft crash landed killing one occupant, severely injuring another and left a third occupant unharmed.   
April – A pilot was killed during an aerobatic display at Deniliquin air pageant in Australia.

1958
 August 2 – (Buffalo Niagara International Airport), Buffalo, NY, Blue Angel number 6 made an emergency landing at the airport before sliding into traffic outside the airport after experiencing afterburner trouble while participating in the Clarence, NY Sesquicentennial celebration. Lt. John R. Dewenter was credited with saving many lives by landing at the Buffalo Niagara International Airport despite the runway deemed too short to stop. Flying a Grumman F-11 Tiger he was able to bring the plane down and stop without injury to others.
 September 20 – Prototype Avro Vulcan VX770 in an airshow at RAF Syerston suffers total collapse of the plane's right wing. The craft spirals out of control and crashes, killing the entire aircrew and 3 people on the ground. VX770 was known to have had a weaker wing structure than production aircraft. The aircraft had been testing the Rolls-Royce Conway installation and was returning from a test flight via Syerston. See 1958 Syerston Avro Vulcan crash for more details.

1957
September 5: Canadian International Air Show (Toronto, Ontario, Canada) – Royal Canadian Air Force Avro Canada CF-100 Mk.4B 18455 pulled up, flamed out, went into inverted spin and crashed. F/O's H.R. Norris and R.C. Dougall were killed.
July 20 – A pilot was killed when his Miles Magister crashed during at display at Burnaston Airport, near Derby, England.
June 8 – Royal Canadian Air Force Avro Canada CF-100 Mk.5 of No. 433 Squadron, North Bay, crashed at a London, Ontario air show after both wings separated from the aircraft. F/O's C.A. Sheffield and Les Sparrow died. Post crash film analysis suggested that the aircraft pulled more g's than it was designed for.
June 7 – (Hensley Field, Dallas, Texas, United States) – Chance Vought Aircraft pilot James P. Buckner is killed while performing a high-speed flight demonstration in a Vought F8U-1 Crusader for a graduating class from the Naval Postgraduate School. Executing a zoom climb after his low-altitude pass, he apparently overstresses the fighter and it disintegrates before he can eject. The aircraft's wreckage violently explodes at low altitude over Main Street in adjacent Grand Prairie, Texas, inflicting minor injuries to several bystanders, and pieces of the fighter are scattered throughout the floodplain of the nearby Trinity River; Buckner's body is recovered a few hours after the crash.

1956
June 9 – RAFA Air Display at Shorts, Sydenham Airport, (Belfast, Northern Ireland) – Shorts Senior Test Pilot Sqn Ldr Walter J. "Wally" Runciman, flying the fourth Short Seamew prototype, was killed when the aircraft "appeared to start a slow roll", the nose falling and there being "insufficient height for recovery". The aircraft avoided crashing into the crowd, hitting the runway "practically nose first".
22 May – Whitsun Air Display (Liverpool, England) – Parachutist and "Birdman" Leo Valentin fell to his death after his wooden wings were damaged after colliding with his jump plane and both of his parachutes failed to deploy.
19 May – A Royal Canadian Air Force CF-100 Mk. 5 of 428 Squadron crashed after the starboard wing separated during a high-speed low-level pass during an air show at Kinross AFB, Michigan. One RCAF and one USAF fatality.

1955
July 7 – Farnborough, England – The pilot of a Hawker Hunter was killed during an eighteen-plane flyby review witnessed by Princess Margaret and an estimated 4,000 spectators.
30 May – Akron–Canton Airport (Green, Ohio) – Pilot Paul Anderson was killed when his plane crashed while performing low altitude loops during an air show.
15 May – Air Display at Griffith, New South Wales, Australia. Two Hawker Sea Furies of the Royal Australian Navy were written off in a collision on the runway. Neither pilot was hurt in the incident.

1954
September 5 – National Aircraft Show (Dayton, Ohio) – Major John L. Armstrong was killed when he crashed his F-86H Sabre while trying to match or break the speed record he had set two days earlier.

1953
October 15 – Harewood Airport (Harewood, New Zealand) – Seven members of the Royal New Zealand Air Force were killed when two of their planes crashed following a mid-air collision during a ceremonial flyover.
September 19 – Canadian International Air Show Royal Canadian Air Force Canadair Sabre 4, piloted by S/L W.R. Greene crashed into Lake Ontario. Greene, who had replaced the originally slated pilot Gordon Bennett, was killed. A T-33 formation team also performing in the show truncated their performance due to low cloud and rain and had entered clouds during looping maneuvers. One aircraft attempted loop recovery without sufficient altitude and hit Lake Ontario.
September 19 – Battle of Britain Air Display RAF Wyton – WA927 a Royal Air Force Gloster Meteor F.8 of 56 Squadron broke-up during a low-level run over the airfield, pilot killed.
September 19 – Battle of Britain Air Display RAF Coningsby – WA836 a Royal Air Force Gloster Meteor F.8 of 74 Squadron broke-up during a high-speed run over the airfield, pilot killed and two women in the crowd injured by debris.
September 6 – National Aircraft Show (Dayton, Ohio, United States) – Marine pilot Major William T. Tebow was injured when the Sikorsky helicopter he was flying "brushed rotor blades" with another helicopter and crash-landed. Tebow was flying in formation when the accident occurred.
3 May – Venice, Italy – Parachutist Salvatore Cannarozzo was killed when his parachute failed to open after he jumped from a height of 9,000 feet at an air show.

1952

October 19 – Barnes Municipal Airport (Westfield, Massachusetts) – United States Air Force Pilots Lt. Robert H. Danell and Capt. Fred H. Stevens were killed when their F-86E Saberjets were involved in a mid-air collision while performing during an air show. 

 August 30 – International Aviation Exposition (Detroit, Michigan) – One of a pair of Northrop F-89 Scorpions disintegrated in flight during a display, killing the pilot, Korean War ace Donald E. Adams and his radar operator.
September 6 – Farnborough Airshow DH.110 crash (Farnborough, UK) – Pilot John Derry and flight test observer Anthony Richards flying a DH.110 were killed when the outer starboard wing, immediately followed by the outer port wing, broke off when the aircraft was pulled into a climb. Wreckage crashed into the spectators, killing 29 and injuring 60. The incident was captured on film.
September 20 – Canadian International Air Show Royal Canadian Air Force Avro Canada CF-100 Canuck Mk.3T piloted by S/L R.D. Schultz made a 500-knot high-speed pass with vertical pull up. This maneuver overstressed the aircraft but the aircraft recovered to CFB North Bay successfully.

1951
September 15 – Three separate accidents in the United Kingdom during Royal Air Force displays to celebrate the Battle of Britain:
Two of four Gloster Meteors of 63 Squadron collided during a formation aerobatic display at RAF Waterbeach, Cambridgeshire, one pilot of WE869 was killed.
A pilot was killed at RAF Thornaby in North Yorkshire when his North American Harvard FX428 crashed after the wing hit the ground while rolling the aircraft back from an inverted flypast.
A pilot was killed at RAF St Athan, Wales when his North American Harvard KF937 crashed while landing after his display.
September 15 – Fall Festival Day (Flagler, Colorado, United States) – Twenty people, including the pilot and 13 children, were killed when a Timm N2T Tutor training plane piloted by Air Force 1st Lt. Norman Jones of Denver flew in low over the crowd and attempted a loop. The pilot had reportedly arrived late and missed the safety briefing which prohibited flying at less than 500 feet above the ground and banned any stunts near the crowd. Lt. Jones was at an approximate altitude of 200 feet when he began his maneuver. Depending on the account, the maneuver was either a loop or a slow roll.
September 3 – Minnesota State Fair (St. Paul, Minnesota, United States) – Biplane pilot Carl Ferriss and his assistant Kitty Middleton, who was strapped to the upper wing, were killed when their plane failed to pull out of a power off dive.
7 May – Lexington Airport (Lexington, Oregon) – Pilot Elmar Payne was killed when his Boeing-Stearman crashed while attempting a slow roll.

1950
October 29 – Norfolk Lions Club Airshow (Norfolk, Virginia) –  Pilot Charles Edward Bailey was killed when the wing of his specially built eleven and a half-foot long stunt plane struck the ground while attempting a low altitude roll.
 July 7 – (Naval Air Station Patuxent River, Maryland) – The third prototype of three Vought XF7U-1 Cutlass twin-tailed fighters, BuNo 122474, suffered an engine explosion during a flight exhibition. Vought test pilot Paul Thayer ejected and parachuted into two feet of water; the airframe impacted on a Patuxent River island. Thayer was returned safely to the admiral's reviewing stand, where the show announcer asked "What will you do for an encore Mr. Thayer?" The pilot had fractured a small bone at the base of his spine – he later told Vought management that he was the only manager who actually "broke his ass for the Company."

1949
 September 11 – Catskill Airport (New York) – Pilot Earl Newton Jr. was killed when his aircraft stalled and nosedived while performing during an air show. 
August 14 – Lodgepole, Nebraska – Parachutist Jimmy F. Taylor was killed when his parachute failed to open when he jumped from a height of 600 feet during an airshow.
 July 24 – Junior Chamber of Commerce air show (Sandusky, Ohio) – Lt. Richard H. Glenn received minor injuries when his F-80 Shooting Star crash-landed. The F-80's auxiliary wingtip fuel tanks collapsed when Lt. Glenn pulled out of a dive and he belly-landed the plane in a field.
 July 4 – Otesgo Airfield (Otsego, Michigan) – former Navy flight instructor, John Jakus, was killed after his BT-13 Valiant crashed while performing a low-altitude roll during an air show performance.
 April 25 – Jackson, Mississippi – Pilot Billy Fischer was killed when his stunt plane lost a wing while performing during an air show.
 January 7 – All-American Air Show (Miami, Florida) – Air Force First Lt. James M. Hall was killed when his P-80 Shooting Star failed to pull up during a low altitude dive.

1948
September 27 – Hales Corners, Wisconsin – Aerial stuntman Dick Powell was killed after falling from an airplane while dangling from his knees over the leading edge of the wing. He was unable to pull himself back up onto the wing and the pilot was unable fly to a nearby lake before he fell.
September 22 – Spalding County Fair (Griffin, Georgia) – Pilot Charlie Rife was killed when his aircraft crashed while doing low altitude stunts. He was a member of an air circus that was part of the fair.
September 19 – Randolph Air Force Base (Universal City, Texas) – The pilot and co-pilot of an F-82 Twin Mustang were killed in a crash following a flyover of the airfield during an airshow.
September 18 – a RAF de Havilland Mosquito crashed during an air show being held at RAF Manston, killing both crew and ten members of the public.

1947
August 10 – Penn Yan Air Show (Penn Yan, New York) – Pilot Chester Rodney Angell was killed when his plane crashed shortly after takeoff to participate in a balloon bursting contest during the air show.
July 20 – Wilson-King Air Show (Twin Falls, Idaho) – Pilot Billy Lear Jr. escaped injury when he crash landed his P-38 after experiencing engine problems following a slow roll maneuver.
July 13 – Sportmen's Pilot Air Show (Seaside, Oregon) – A stunt parachutist had to be rescued after being blown off course into the ocean.
 July 4 – Decorah air show (Decorah, Iowa)- Pilot and former WASP Marge Hurlburt was killed when her T-6 Texan crashed while performing a slow roll. At the time she was performing with the "Flying Tigers" aerial circus troupe.
 June 22 – Wilson-King Sky Show (St. George, Utah) – Sixteen-year-old spectator DeLores Woodbury was killed and two other spectators were injured when a Curtiss SB2C Helldiver involved with the airshow experienced brake failure on landing and crashed into cars parked at the edge of the airfield. The pilot, Bernadine Lewis King, was not seriously injured.
 June 4 – Veterans of Foreign Wars Airshow (Atlantic Beach, North Carolina) – A U.S. Marine Corps Vought F4U-4 Corsair crashed in the surf at Atlantic Beach, North Carolina during a VFW airshow, and pilot Lt. Gene Dial, of MCAS Cherry Point, North Carolina, walked some 15 feet to shore unhurt. The pilot, with four and a half years of service, said that he crashed once before during a carrier take-off.
 18 May – Municipal airport air show (Burlington, Iowa) – Lt. John Peeler was killed when his Navy F4U Corsair crashed into a sandlot baseball game and caught fire a few blocks from the airport. Two teenagers on the ground were killed and seven others injured.

1946
 November 10 – Tulsa police air patrol show (Tulsa, Oklahoma) – former Army Air Force instructor Wesley W. Cunningham was killed when his aircraft failed to pull out of a low altitude spin. At the time Cunningham was involved in a skit playing the part of a woman spectator who is chosen from the crowd to fly the airplane.
 September 16 – Twin Falls Air Show (Twin Falls, Idaho) – Four crew members were killed when their A-26 Invader crashed while performing a loop during a local airshow.
 September 15 – Flying Tiger Air Circus (Bowling Green, Ohio) – Army veteran Gordon Lahman was killed when his parachute failed to open during a 1,500-foot delayed jump at the start of the circus.
 August 9 – North Montana State Fair (Great Falls, Montana) – Seven were killed when two A-26 Invader attack bombers, part of a low-flying three-plane formation, collided in mid-air 750 feet in front of a grandstand filled with 20,000 spectators. The wing from one bomber sheared off the tail section of another. The tail-less plane crashed into a horse barn, killing three crew members, three people on the ground and twenty thoroughbred horses; the other bomber managed to continue flying for one or five miles (sources differ) before crashing in a field, killing one of the crew. The third bomber in the formation landed safely.
August 5 – Pittsburgh Airport (Pittsburgh, Pennsylvania) – United States Army Air Forces pilot Major Leonard Weihardt suffered minor injuries when his jet fighter crashed during an air show.

1945
 27 May – Army Air Forces Fair (Wright Field, Dayton, Ohio) – The third prototype Curtiss XP-55 Ascender, 42-78847, crashed during an exhibition, killing the pilot William C. Glasgow and two to four civilians (sources differ) on the ground. The pilot attempted a slow roll after a low pass in formation with a P-38 and a P-51 on each wing, but lost altitude and crashed, sending flaming debris into occupied civilian vehicles on a highway near the airfield.

1944
July 23 – Spokane Air Show (Spokane, Washington) – Four United States Army Air Forces aviators, pilots Second Lt.'s William R. Scott and George Chrep along with Capt. Ford K. Sayre and an unidentified sergeant, were killed when their two A-25 Shrike bombers were involved in a mid-air collision while ascending from a dive.

1943
September 4 – Defense forces public air display, Flemington Racecourse, Melbourne, Australia. A Royal Australian Air Force Vultee Vengeance became inverted at low level after pulling up from a mock bomb dive and went out of control. The aircraft crashed in a nearby industrial suburb, setting fire to a grain mill and narrowly missing a nearby crowded railway station. The plane's occupants, Flight-Lieutenant Richard Roe and his wireless air-gunner James Harris, were both killed. There were no casualties on the ground.
August 1 – Lambert Field, St. Louis, Missouri, USA – Waco CG-4A-RO 42-78839, built by St. Louis contractor Robertson Aircraft Corporation, loses its right-hand wing immediately after being released over the airfield by the tow airplane. Several thousand people had gathered to watch the first public demonstration of the St. Louis-built troop-carrying glider, which was carrying 2 USAAF crewmen, St. Louis mayor William D. Becker, Robertson Aircraft and Lambert Field co-founder Maj. William B. Robertson, and 6 other VIP passengers; all 10 perish in the ensuing crash. The accident is attributed to the failure of a defective wing strut fitting.
17 May – Waxahachie, Texas – Flight Instructor Lieutenant William S. Farrish and Sergeant Jasper J. DeMaria, Jr. were killed when their military trainer, from the Army Flying School in Waco, Texas, went into a spin and crashed during an air show.
April 14 – Jervis Bay, New South Wales, Australia. Two Royal Australian Air Force Bristol Beauforts collided whilst pulling up from a dummy bomb run during an air display for war correspondents on board a nearby vessel. All eight crew on board the two aircraft were killed. A Fox Movietone News cameraman caught the incident on film.

1940
 October 20 – Marianna airshow (Marianna, Arkansas) – A parachutist and five people on board a sightseeing plane were killed when the plane became entangled in the parachute. The plane had been circling the parachutist during his descent prior to the accident.

1939
 July 10 – Brussels, Belgium – German Air Force Captain Wille was killed in a crash during a multi-country military aircraft display.
 January 14 – Havana airdrome (Havana, Cuba) – Captain Manuel Orta, a Cuban Army flier, was killed when his Curtis Hawk failed to pull up from a high speed dive and crashed on top of a parked Beechcraft airplane.

1938
 July 24 – (Campo de Marte, Santa Ana, Usaquén, Colombia) – A pilot performing an aerobatic display crashed a Curtiss Hawk II into a crowd attending a military review. Sources differ on the number killed and injured; up to 75 died and 100 or more were injured. According to Time magazine, the pilot, Flight Lt. Cesar Abadia of the Colombian Air Force, disregarded standing orders not to fly below 500 feet and attempted to dive through a narrow gap between two grandstands. The pilot misjudged his approach and a wingtip hit the Diplomatic stand; the plane then smashed against the Presidential stand and exploded, raining flaming debris down on spectators located between the two grandstands.
 1 May – Bonlee, North Carolina – Pilot Seldon Hunna was killed when he lost control of his plane while in a corkscrew spin and crashed into three parked cars.

1937
December 4 – Miami Air Show (Miami, Florida) – Rudy Kling and Frank Haines were killed in separate crashes, within seconds of each other, during a speed race. It was speculated that "Kling lost speed in a low altitude turn and Haines was caught in Kling's propeller wash" causing him to crash 150 yards beyond Kling's wreckage.
September 10 – Scarborough, England — Wing Commander's P.C. Sherren and E.G. Hilton both killed when their plane, a Miles M3A Falcon G-ENG crashes during the King's Cup Race, en route from Hatfield Aerodrome.
September 4 – Cleveland Airport (Cleveland, Ohio) – German Count Otto Hasenburg suffered minor injuries when the aircraft he was piloting crashed while flying inverted during an air show.
June 27 – Westchester Airport (Armonk, New York) – Parachutist Waldo Fraser was killed when his parachute failed to properly deploy during a demonstration jump.
29 May – Isle of Man Air Race (Hanworth, England) – Pilot S.W. Sparkes, his passenger and the occupant of a home were killed when his Percival Gull struck a home and burst into flames.
29 May – A number of separate accidents in the United Kingdom during air displays to celebrate Empire Air Day:
Two pilots were killed at Farnborough, Hampshire when Hawker Audax K3066 crashed 
One pilot was killed at Old Sarum when Hawker Audax K3698 stalled and crashed.
One pilot was killed at Tangmere, Sussex when Hawker Fury K2086 spun in during the display.
One pilot was killed at Waddington, Lincolnshire when Hawker Fury K8228 crashed during a slow roll.
Pilot and three passengers were killed when Airspeed Envoy G-ACSZ crashed during a pleasure flight at Doncaster.

1936
July 18 – Canfield Flying Circus at Noonan, North Dakota – Pilot Dorotha Canfield and passenger Albert Lee were killed when their plane nosedived and crashed following an aborted landing attempt. It was undetermined whether Canfield or Lee, a former pilot, was in control of the dual control biplane at the time of the crash.

1935
 November 22 – Roseboro, North Carolina – Parachutist Tommy Gibbons was killed when his chute opened late during a jump at an air circus.
 September 7 – Blackpool, England – While demonstrating formation flying, Captain Stewart's Avro passed underneath another plane and had its tail cut off by the other plane's propeller. He and two passengers, sisters Lillian and Dorothy Barnes, were killed in the crash.
 July 30 – Sir Alan Cobham's Air Circus (Huntingdonshire, England) – Pilot G.E. Collins was killed when his glider crashed after losing a wing during a demonstration. 
 July 21 – Chambersburg, Pennsylvania – Pilot Herbert Foreman along with passengers Glenn Calhoun and Charles Light were killed when their aircraft went into a spin during an airport dedication show. The passengers had won their places on the flight by selling tickets to the show.
 31 May – Woodford Aerodrome (Woodford, England) – Parachutist Ivor Price was killed when his parachute failed to open during a two-person jump display.
 18 May – Moscow, USSR – a crash of a giant propaganda plane Tupolev ANT-20 Maxim Gorky during a demonstration flight over Moscow. As a result of a poorly executed loop manoeuvre around the plane performed by an accompanying I-5 fighter (pilot – Nikolai Blagin), both planes collided. Forty-six people aboard both planes were killed.
 March 23 – Jackson, Mississippi – Pilot Herb Bassett was killed when his airplane failed to come out of a tailspin and his parachute became entangled in the aircraft when he tried to jump.

1934
August 28 – Warsaw, Poland – during an opening ceremony of the Challenge International de Tourisme 1934, a PZL P.7a fighter of Sgt. Dłuto, performing aerobatics at low altitude, crashed into a ground. The pilot was seriously injured.
August 5 – Women's National Air Meet (Dayton, Ohio) – Pilot Frances Harrell Marsalis was killed when she lost control of her biplane while banking to avoid other aircraft during a race.
July 1 – Hornell, New York – Pilot Merriell S. McHenry was killed when he bailed out of his plane at too low an altitude. His plane had stalled and entered a nosedive following a parachutist successfully jumping from the plane.  
June 30 – Royal Air Force Hawker Hart K2983 crashed during a display at RAF Hendon killing the passenger.
June 25 – Esseg, Serbia – Eight spectators were killed and thirteen injured when a stunt pilot was unable to recover from a dive and crashed into a crowd of spectators.
20 May – Wink, Texas – Pilot Harry Lynch and three passengers were killed when their aircraft struck power lines while stunting during an airport dedication ceremony.

1933
October 30 – Four members of a flying circus troupe were killed after a mid-air collision over Amarillo, Texas, United States. The planes were flying through streamers dropped by a third aircraft when the collision occurred.
October 1 – Drogheda, Ireland – Captain K. Rose was killed and two passengers were injured while taking part in an air circus.
September 25 – Newport, Vermont – Parachutist Robert Keating was killed when he misjudged his jump height and struck the water at Derby Pond before a crowd of 3,000 spectators.
July 4 – Century of Progress World's Fair (Chicago, Illinois) – Parachutist Joe Wilson was killed when he failed to open his parachute during a nighttime jump when a fireworks display was occurring. It was speculated that he may have been knocked unconscious during the jump.
June 18 – An aircraft crashed during aerobatics on a hangar during a flying display at Essey near Nancy, France during a display killing the pilot and a spectator and injuring 40 others.
27 May – Welland Municipal Airport (Welland, Ontario, Canada) – Parachutist Elsie Storrow was killed when she delayed deploying her parachute during a demonstration jump as part of the dedication ceremonies for the airport.
13 May – American Air Races (Oklahoma City, Oklahoma) – Pilot Art Killips was killed when his aircraft stalled and crashed while performing multiple snap roll maneuvers.

1932
September 5 – Cleveland National Air Races (Cleveland, Ohio) – Pilot Al Wilson was killed when he was involved in a collision with an Autogyro while performing stunts. John Miller, the pilot of the autogyro, was injured but his passenger was uninjured.
August 7 – Fairfax Municipal Airport (Kansas City, Kansas) – Pilot Mildred Kauffman was killed when her plane was involved in a mid-air collision in which the wings of both aircraft struck and locked together during an opposite direction flyby with both planes crashing from an approximate height of seventy-five feet. Don Moss, the pilot of the other plane, along with his passenger and Kauffman's passenger were not injured.
22 May – American Legion Air Circus (Delano, California, United States) – Pilot Fred Larson, flying the sister ship of the Spirit of St. Louis, was killed and passenger William Simmons was injured after their plane lost altitude while making a turn. The plane's wing struck the ground causing the plane to flip over and burst into flames.
October 5 – Avro 504K G-AAUJ crashed while performing an aerobatic display at the National Aviation Day display at Plompton, near Harrogate, Yorkshire, England, killing one of the two passengers.

1931
 June 13 – Avro Avian G-AAHJ crashed during a display at Cambridge Airport during an air display killing the pilot. The starboard wing broke up during a steep dive.
 17 May – Omaha, Nebraska – Pilot Charles W. "Speed" Holman was killed while performing before a crowd of 20,000 spectators at the opening of a new airport.
 April 30 – Lynchburg, Virginia – Pilot Clarence M. Ellicock was killed when the aileron on his plane loosened while performing a demonstration during the dedication ceremonies of the municipal airport.

1930
November 2 – Preakness, New Jersey – Pilot Alden H. Russell was injured and his passenger was killed when his aircraft went into a tailspin and crashed while stunting before a crowd of 5,000 at the local airport. 
September 18 – Stuttgart, Germany – Acrobat Fritz Schindler along with three pilots were killed when two planes crashed while attempting to transfer Schindler from one plane to the other via a rope ladder.
September 14 – Binghamton, New York – Sixteen year old Ciara Lechner was killed while attempting her first parachute jump at an air circus. Neither chute was opened and the professional parachutist on board failed to follow her after she left the plane.
August 28 – Iowa State Fairgrounds (Des Moines, Iowa) – Four people were critically injured when two aircraft were involved in a mid-air collision while stunting. One of the crafts crash landed on a tent and the other was able to land.
August 27 – Chicago – Navy pilot Lieutenant J.P. Deshazo was killed during the national air races when he lost control while attempting a barrel roll during a 50-mile speed race with 16 Navy planes. He crashed in front of the bleachers killing concessionaire Louis Weiner and injuring seven others from shrapnel from the exploding fuel tank or burning oil from the aircraft.
 July 11 – Michigan Cherry Festival (Traverse City, Michigan) -Pilot Lieutenant A.H. Coleman was killed and passenger George Watson was seriously injured when their aircraft failed to pull out of a dive while performing stunts.
July 4 – Neosho Airport (Neosho, Missouri) During a wing walking performance an unidentified pilot and wing walker were killed when the wing collapsed on their aircraft sending it into a tailspin.
30 May – Memorial Day display (Arnettsville, West Virginia) – Pilots Loren Scott and Everett Arnholtt were killed after colliding with a tree during a memorial day flying display.
April 27 – (Fayetteville, Tennessee) – At least nine air show spectators were killed and about twenty injured when pilot Milton P. Covert's plane lost altitude and crashed while approaching the landing area. The victims were standing on a railroad embankment as the plane approached at a low altitude. At the time there were claims that the pilot was deliberately trying to scare the spectators off the embankment. The pilot and his two passengers escaped unhurt, but Covert was later arraigned on charges.
April 27 – Düsseldorf – Aerial acrobat Willy Hundertmark was killed while attempting a plane change over via a rope ladder while in flight. After successfully getting on the ladder dangling from the upper plane he became entangled and couldn't ascend. After 45 minutes the pilot attempted a low speed landing and dragged Mr Hundertmark "over a long stretch of the field".
March 30 – Buffalo Airport (Cheektowaga, New York) – Pilot Mildred Kaufmann parachuted safely after being ejected from her aircraft while performing loops. She was using a borrowed aircraft at the time and not her modified craft that she normally used due to her small stature. The unoccupied plane crashed near a hangar at the airport.

1929
November 11 – Marlborough, Massachusetts – Lieutenant William P. Leonard was killed when his aircraft nosedived and crashed while performing stunts with a second aircraft before a crowd of 7,000.
October 7 – Cross Keys Airport (Altoona, Pennsylvania, United States) – A parachutist was killed when his parachute failed to open while putting on a display in front of a crowd of 1,000 persons.
October 7 – Keystone Airport (Johnstown, Pennsylvania, United States) – A pilot was killed while attempting a low altitude barrel roll. His plane went into a tail spin and crashed into a swamp.
July 27 – Cohoes Airport Carnival (Cohoes, New York) – Pilot G.H. Perin was injured when his aircraft failed to recover from a low altitude dive while involved in a balloon popping contest.

1928
 November 11 – Pocatello Airport (Pocatello, Idaho) – Pilot Harry McDougall and passenger Elda Rice were killed when their aircraft went into a tailspin during an air race. 
 October 11 – Hendon, England – RAF Lieutenant Somerville and Corporal Loud were killed during an air force exhibition when their aircraft lost its tail during a low altitude flyby. The Sultan of Muscat was in attendance at the time of the accident.
June 28 – Vincennes Fair (Vincennes, France) – Pilot Alfred Fronval was killed when his aircraft struck a parked military aircraft while landing.
5 May – Dayton, Ohio – Pilot Harold J. Forshay and his two passengers, Walter Clark and Blair Cross, were killed when their plane crashed while performing stunts in front of hundreds of spectators.
February 15 – Southeastern Air Derby (Macon, Georgia) – Pilot Buck Steel and passenger Francis Ashcraft were killed when an explosive device that was thrown from their plane detonated prematurely either killing them instantly or rendering them unable to control the plane that then crashed in town killing a pedestrian. Eight others on the ground were injured either from the plane crash or the collapse of a sidewalk near the crash site.

1927
November 21 – Santa Monica, California – Parachutist Miss Jean West escaped uninjured following a parachute demonstration accident. Her parachute became entangled on the wing following her jump but the pilot was able to safely land while dragging Miss West several hundred feet.
September 12 – Gates Flying Circus at Poughkeepsie, New York – While performing loop to loops above the city a loose chain fell from the stunt planes cockpit and crashed through the roof of a local theatre landing on the stage.
July 4 – Preston's Field (Amenia, New York) – Pilot William Cooke and passenger Thomas Moawood were injured when their Curtiss Jenny scout plane crashed while performing stunts from an approximate height of 300 feet.

1926
August 15 – Atlanta, Georgia – Parachutist Jimmy Calhoun was killed when he lost his grip on his parachute, at too high an altitude, while preparing to dive into a lake at an amusement park while 10,000 spectators watched.
24 May – Chariton, Iowa – Spectator M.H. Johnson was killed and trapeze performer Eva Murphy was injured during a stunt demonstration. Mr. Murphy was trying to remove Mr. Johnson's hat during a low altitude flyby while hanging from an airplane mounted trapeze. Mr. Johnson was struck and died from a head injury.
April 18 – Vero, Florida – Volunteer performer Jewell Bell was killed after leaping from a low flying plane, at approximately fifty feet, into the ocean during an air circus performance.

1925
 August 23 – Baer Municipal Aviation Field Fort Wayne, Indiana – Pilot H. Huntley was struck by the propeller of the aircraft he was attempting to start. Huntley was knocked unconscious and suffered a fractured shoulder in the mishap.
 June 7 – American Legion Flying Circus (Cape Girardeau, Missouri) – Passengers Grace Lamar and Pearl Baysinger were killed when pilot John Hunter's plane crashed into a tree and burned.

1924
October 12 – Wichita, Kansas – Parachutist Ruth Garver was killed when her parachute failed to open during a performance before a crowd of 10,000 spectators.
October 8 – Virginia State Fair (Richmond, Virginia) – Pilot Russell Simon was killed following a mid-air collision with another plane during an exhibition flight. His plane crashed into the roof of a building on the fairground and he was ejected from the plane.
October 4 – National Air Races (Dayton, Ohio) – Captain Burt Skeel, pilot of a Curtis racing plane, was killed when the wings of his plane buckled prior to his start in the race.
March 23 – Jacksonville, Florida – Stunt woman Mabel Cody was injured after she fell from an airplane while attempting to transfer to the plane from a speeding automobile.
March 3 – San Antonio, Texas – Pilot Bertha Horchem was killed when her plane crashed while performing with an air circus group in front of 3,000 spectators. The left wing of her plane collapsed while performing a loop at approximately 1,200 feet.

1923
November 18 – The first aerial refueling-related fatality occurs during an air show at Kelly Field, Texas, when the fuel hose becomes entangled in the right wings of the refueler and the receiver aircraft. The Army Air Service pilot of the refueler, Lt. P. T. Wagner, is killed in the ensuing crash of DH-4B, 23–444.

1922

October 13 – Cleveland, Tennessee – Stuntwoman Eva Moss was killed after the plane she was hanging from was forced to land. She had performed a stunt of hanging by her teeth from a rope ladder and was either unable or unwilling to climb back into the aircraft. The pilot then flew low over a lake and signaled her to drop into the water but she did not follow his directions. The pilot was then forced to land which caused the fatal injuries to Ms. Moss.
September 23 – Mitchel Field, Mineola, New York – A Martin NBS-1 bomber, AS-68487, Raymond E. Davis, pilot, nose dived and crashed from an estimated altitude of 500 feet on a residential street killing the six military personnel on board. At the time, the plane was involved in a night time war game display that was lit by searchlights and watched by an estimated crowd of 25,000 spectators.
September 7 – Rutland, Vermont – Lieutenant Belvin W. Maynard, pilot, along with mechanic Charles Mionette and passenger Lieutenant I. R. Wood were killed when their plane nosedived while attempting a tailspin at a low altitude. Parachutist Henry A. "Daredevil" Smith was killed a few hours later when his parachute failed to properly deploy.
August 19 – Brattleboro, Vermont – Passengers Evelyn Harris, James Trahan and Trahan's five-year-old son were killed when the stunt aircraft, that they were passengers in, crashed after striking a tree during takeoff during dedication ceremonies for a new airport.
August 15 – Puck, Poland – during a bombing show, an observer prematurely dropped a bomb from a Lübeck-Travemünde F.4 floatplane into spectators, killing 13 persons and injuring 34.
June 17 – Louisville, Kentucky – Army airmen Lieutenant Robert O. Hanley (also reported as Robert E. Hanley) and Sergeant Arthur Opperman are killed when their DH.4, U.S. Army Air Service serial number not recorded, crashed while making a sharp banking turn. Airframe destroyed by post-crash fire. The men were airborne to photograph the airshow that was to shortly begin. The aircraft was assigned to the 7th Photo Section at Godman Field, Camp Knox, Kentucky.
21 May – Presidio of San Francisco – Stuntman Wesley May was fatally injured during a parachute jump. He misjudged his altitude and released himself from his parachute to avoid hitting a tree. Wesley fell approximately fifty feet and struck a tombstone in a cemetery and died in an army hospital.
February 22 – San Jose, California – Parachutist Thorton "Jinx" Jenkins was killed when his parachute partially opened during a jump at an air circus.
January 22 – Askersund, Sweden – Parachutist Elsa Andersson was killed when her parachute failed to open during a jump.

1921
October 4 – Long Branch, New Jersey – Miss Madeline Davis, a twenty-three-year-old professional stunt flier, was killed while attempting to become the first woman to transfer from a moving automobile to an airplane flying overhead via a rope ladder. She died shortly after losing her grip on the ladder and striking the ground while traveling at approximately forty-five miles per hour.
September 24 – State Fairgrounds (Oklahoma City, Oklahoma) – Lieutenant Arthur Emerson was killed while attempting to transfer from one aircraft to another mid-flight.
September 24- St. Louis Dispatch Flying Circus at Bemidji, Minnesota – Pilot Edward Fox and passenger John Harris were injured when their plane crashed when it failed to recover while performing a nosedive.
June 10 – Huntington Beach, California – One person was killed and eight injured when an airplane that was performing stunts crashed into a group of spectators on the beach.
June 5 – Curtiss Field (Mineola, New York) – Stunt pilot Laura Bromwell was killed after her aircraft went into a tailspin and crashed when her plane's engine quit while performing loop-the-loops.
June 5 – Salisbury Beach, Massachusetts – Parachutist Jack "Daredevil Jack" Murphy drowned after landing in the ocean far from shore during a demonstration with a crowd of thousands watching.
30 May – Wisconsin State Fairgrounds (Milwaukee, Wisconsin) – Sixteen people were injured when a stunt plane crashed while performing a transfer of a person on an airplane to moving automobile via a ladder stunt. The ladder became hooked on the automobiles exhaust pipe and lifted the vehicle's rear end and threw it out of control. The airplane was heading toward the grandstand area when the pilot swung the plane and crashed it into the spectator boxes lining the track area.
15 May – Grand Island, Nebraska – Stunt Pilot Warren P. Kite was killed following a mid-air collision in which the tail section of his aircraft was severed by an aircraft piloted by J.H. Smith who escaped injury.

1920
September 18 – New York State Fair (Syracuse, New York) – Stuntman "Tex" McLauglin was injured when he was struck by the propeller of an aircraft while transferring mid-air from one aircraft to another via a rope ladder. He was able to hold onto the ladder while the aircraft landed and was dragged approximately 100 feet before the aircraft was able to stop. 
September 3 – Sonoma County Fair (Santa Rosa, California) – Pilot Leon Ferguson was killed when his plane went into a tailspin while he was performing a stunt in which he hung by his toes off one of the wings of the plane.
July 5 – Dundalk Flying Field, opened in Baltimore, Maryland in 1920, is almost immediately renamed Logan Field when, on this date, Army Lt. Patrick H. Logan is fatally injured after his Nieuport 28, F6506, nicknamed the "Red Devil," of the 104th Observation Squadron, crashes at the airport's inaugural air show following a stall/spin. In response to the tragedy, the airfield is renamed in his honor, with the announcement of the new name being made at the closing ceremonies of the airshow during which he died.
February 2 – Tampa, Florida – Stuntman "Freddie" Owens was injured when his right foot was severed by a propeller while transferring mid-air from one aircraft to another.

1919

August 23 – Warsaw, Poland – Two crewmen, including aircraft builder Karol Słowik, were killed during a ceremonial public flight in front of Polish chief-of-state Marshal Józef Piłsudski.  The plane, the first aircraft built in a newly independent Poland, was a copy of a Hannover CL.II and crashed due to faulty cabling.
August 15 – Baltimore, Maryland – While performing aerial stunts at Patterson Park a military aircraft crash landed through a fence and into a baseball diamond killing three children and injuring a number of others.
July 17 – Americus, Georgia – Sergeant Gordon Gates, of the Army Air Services, was killed when his safety belt failed while he was flying inverted during an air circus. His plane continued flying unmanned for a half a mile before finally crashing.

1916
June 25 – Charles Franklin Niles was an early aviator having been taught by Glenn Curtiss in 1913. It was stated in his obituary that he was the first to fly around the Statue of Liberty, and that he served as an aviator in the 1910–1920 Mexican Revolution. On June 25, 1916, while flying a loop maneuver in his Moisant monoplane at the Oshkosh, Wisconsin fairgrounds a wing collapsed and he crashed. He died of his injuries the next day. A witness to the crash was cartoonist Robert Osborn.

1915
October 25 – Panama–Pacific International Exposition (San Francisco, California) – Pilot Charles Niles was injured when he crashed while landing during an exhibition flight.
September 22 – Colorado State Fair (Pueblo, Colorado) – Parachutist Eddie Coy was killed when his parachute malfunctioned after he jumped from a balloon at a height of 1,800 feet. 
March 14 – San Francisco, California – Famed aerialist Lincoln Beachey, performing at the Panama–Pacific International Exposition before a crowd of at least 50,000 onlookers, attempted the first exhibition of inverted flight in a monoplane. Beginning the stunt only 2000 feet above the waters of San Francisco Bay, Beachey pulled sharply on the controls to resume level flight, but the resulting pressure on the wing spars caused them to snap and the plane plunged into the water. Beachey actually survived the crash but drowned as rescuers were unable to extract him for nearly two hours.

1914
April 19 - Buc, Normandy France: Two monoplanes collided resulting in two seriously injured and two killed. André Bidot and his passenger Mr. Pellato, collides with the aeroplane flown by François Deroye and passenger Mr. Dablin at around 16:30. A third aircraft taking part in the chase, piloted by a Mr. Coendett, was not involved in the collision and landed safely. Deroye's aircraft caught fire and both he and Mr. Dablin perished in the flames. Bidot's aircraft crashed relatively intact, but caught fire after impact, seriously injuring Bidot and Mr. Pellato.

September 16 – State Fairgrounds (Pueblo, Colorado) – Aviator Weldon B. Cooke was killed when his aircraft stalled and crashed from a height of 2,000 feet during an exhibition flight.

1913
October 7 – Hammondsport, New York – One spectator was killed and several injured when they were knocked off a roof by the wing of an aircraft piloted by Lincoln J. Beachey. He escaped injury when he crashed following the accident.
October 1 – Randolph County Fairgrounds (Elkins, West Virginia) – Pilot Irving Conley along with several spectators were injured when his aircraft fell from a height of fifty feet.
October 1 – Binghamton Industrial Exposition (Binghamton, New York) – Pilot Earl V. Fritts escaped injury when he glided his aircraft to earth following the failure of his propeller and crankshaft while flying at an altitude of 500 feet.
September 25 – Mesa County Fair (Grand Junction, Colorado) – Pilot H.W. Blakely suffered minor injuries when his aircraft crashed following an engine stall while he was flying at a height of 85 feet.
September 9 – Carmi, Illinois – Pilot Tony Jannus escaped injury when he landed his aircraft after the carburetor fell off his engine while flying at an altitude of 900 feet during an exhibition flight.  
August 6 – Carnival Week (Victoria, British Columbia, Canada) – Pilot Johnny Bryant was killed when his aircraft crashed during an exhibition flight at the water carnival celebrations.
July 19 – Golden Potlatch (Seattle, Washington) – Parachutist Francis L. Thayer was killed when his parachute harness broke at a height of 600 feet and he fell into Puget Sound.

1912

September 20 – Cicero Aviation Field (Chicago, Illinois) – Pilot Howard W. Gill was killed and pilot George Mestach injured when their aircraft were involved in a mid-air collision during a race.
September 8 – Gray, Haute-Saône, France – Four spectators were killed and ten injured when an out of control aircraft crashed into a crowd.
August 23 – Prowers County Fair (Lamar, Colorado) – Pilot George Thompson was killed when his aircraft struck a tree on takeoff and he was crushed by falling debris.
July 20 – Columbia Park (Buffalo, New York) – Pilot W. F. Zehler escaped with minor injuries, when he was ejected from his aircraft, after it struck a fence during a failed takeoff attempt before a crowd of 2,000. 
July 1 – Third Annual Boston Aviation Meet (Squantum, Massachusetts) – Pilot Harriet Quimby, the first woman in the United States to receive a pilots license, and her passenger, event organizer William A.P. Willard, were killed when they were ejected from their aircraft when it suddenly pitched forward at an altitude of 1,000 feet.
30 May – Meadows Race Track (Seattle, Washington) – Two spectators were killed and pilot J. Clifford Turpin, (along with more than a dozen people injured), when a photographer stepped in front of Turpin's aircraft during his takeoff run. Turpin swerved to avoid the photographer but his aircraft's wing struck a pole and pivoted the craft into the grandstands.
14 May – London, England – Pilot E.V. Fisher and passenger Victor Lewis Mason were killed when their aircraft went out of control. Mason was ejected from the aircraft mid-air and Fisher died in the wrecked craft which had caught fire.
January 22 – Third International Aviation Meet (Carson, California) – Pilot Rutherford Page was killed when he lost control of his aircraft at a height of 150 feet and either jumped or fell from the craft when it was at a height of 60 feet.

1911
October 19, while flying at an exhibition in Macon, Georgia, Eugene Burton Ely was late pulling out of a dive and crashed. Ely jumped clear of the wrecked aircraft, but his neck was broken, and he died a few minutes later. Spectators picked the wreckage clean looking for souvenirs, including Ely's gloves, tie and cap.
October 11, James Robert Kenney, an exposition visitor, was killed when attempting to pass in front of a biplane. Kinney crossed the path of the plane just an instant before it began to leave the ground; a corner of the elevator struck him under the chin, breaking his neck and killing him almost instantly. Darold Robinson (the pilot) reversed his engines when he saw Kinney turn directly in his path, but it was already too late. Robinson was preparing to give a demonstration and exhibition flights when the tragedy occurred.
October 2 – Interstate Fairgrounds (Spokane, Washington) – Pilot Cromwell Dixon, the youngest licensed aviator at the time, was killed after his plane crashed after encountering a downdraft.
 August 16 – 1911 Chicago International Aviation Meet (Chicago, Illinois) – Pilot Arthur Stone escaped injury when his Queen Monoplane crashed in Lake Michigan. Pilot Howard Gill was not injured when his Baby Wright aircraft crashed while landing.
August 15 – 1911 Chicago International Aviation Meet (Chicago, Illinois) – Two pilots were killed in separate accidents on this day. William R. Badger was killed when his aircraft's wings collapsed while in a dive and pilot St. Croix Johnstone was killed when his aircraft experienced engine failure and crashed into Lake Michigan.
23 May – Strassberg, Germany – Aviator Laemmlin was killed when he fell from a height of 200 feet during an aeroplane competition.
21 May – Paris to Madrid Air Race (Paris, France) – The French Minister of War Henri Maurice Berteaux was killed. Aviation patron Henri Deutsch de la Meurthe, Prime Minister of France Ernest Monis and Monis's son were injured when an aircraft lost power and crashed into a group of spectators at the start of the race.
20 May – Kursk – One hundred spectators were injured when an aircraft crashed into a crowd.
January 10 – Aviation Field (San Francisco, California) – Pilot Hubert Latham escaped injury when his Antionette monoplane encountered strong winds and crashed into a fence.

1910
December 29 – Aviation Field (Los Angeles, California) – Pilot Glen Martin escaped injury when his aircraft was blown into a fence while landing at the end of the meet. He was trying to qualify for his pilots license at the time of the crash.
November 22 – Register Aviation Meet (Mobile, Alabama) – Pilot J.D.A. McCurdy escaped injury following a crash when his aircraft's wing struck the ground.
November 17 – Reno Air Meet (Reno, Nevada) – Pilot Fred Wiseman escaped injury when his plane crashed shortly after takeoff missing the grandstand and crash landing in an irrigation ditch. 
November 17 – Denver Aviation Meeting (Denver, Colorado) – Pilot Ralph Johnstone, world's record holder for highest altitude in an aircraft at the time, was killed when his aircraft failed to recover from a dive during an air meet.
October 29 – Gordon Bennett Trophy Race (Belmont, New York) – French pilot Alfred Leblanc was injured when his aircraft struck a telephone pole and crashed. American pilot Walter Brookins was injured in a crash shortly after Leblanc's accident.
October 1 – Milan, Italy – British pilot Captain Dickson was killed and a French pilot named Thomas was injured when their aircraft were involved in, what was reported at the time, the first mid-air collision between aircraft.
September 16 – Wisconsin State Fair (Milwaukee, Wisconsin) – Eight spectators were injured when an aircraft piloted by Archibald Hoxsey swerved and crashed into the crowd.
September 10 – California State Fair (Sacramento, California) – Aviator Hamilton was injured when he lost control and crashed.
August 10 – Chicago School of Aviation (Chicago, Illinois) – Seven spectators were injured when an aircraft piloted by Frank Bellai fell from a height of 100 feet onto a group of 150 spectators.
August 10 – Interlaken Aviation Field (Interlaken, New Jersey) – Pilot Walter Brookins, along with seven spectators, were injured when his aircraft inverted and crashed onto a group of spectators while attempting to land in bad weather.
July 12 – Hengistbury Airfield Bournemouth, United Kingdom – At the age of 32, Charles Stewart Rolls was killed when the tail of his Wright Flyer broke off during a flying display. Together with Frederick Henry Royce he had co-founded the Rolls-Royce car manufacturing firm. He was the first Briton to be killed in an aeronautical accident, and the twelfth internationally. A statue in his memory, in which he is seen holding an incomplete biplane model, was erected in Agincourt Square, Monmouth. Following the crash of Rolls, another aviator named Audumar was seriously injured when his aircraft crashed at the same show.
July 9 –  Coventry, England – Parachutist Viola Spencer was killed when her parachute failed to open properly during an exhibition jump.
July 8 – Reims, France – Pilot Raymonde de Laroche was injured when she crashed after the engine of her aircraft stopped while she was flying at an altitude of approximately 240 feet. She was performing an exhibition flight in front of thousands of spectators at the time of the accident.
July 6 – Pittsburg, Kansas – Pilot Arch Hoxsey escaped injury when his aircraft crashed following an engine failure at 500 feet.
July 2 – Emeryville Racetrack (Oakland, California) – Pilot Samuel Smith was injured when his aircraft crash landed on top of a Farman Biplane piloted by Clifford O'Brien that had just crashed. O'Brien wasn't injured in the accident
June 13 – Springfield, Missouri – Pilot Charles F. Willard was injured when his aircraft's engine stopped while flying at a height of 50 feet.
June 9 – Worcester, England – While attempting an exhibition at an agricultural show an aviator lost control of his aircraft and crashed into a crowd of spectators killing one and injuring himself and several others.
1 May – Fairgrounds (Fresno, California) – Pilot Whipple S. Hall was injured when he lost control of his aircraft and crashed into a fence while giving an exhibition flight.
April 26 – Issy-les-Moulineaux, Paris, France – Pilot Émile Dubonnet escaped injury when his aircraft crashed in heavy winds while performing a demonstration flight for former president Theodore Roosevelt.
February 4 – Denver, Colorado – Pilot Louis Paulhan escaped injury when his aircraft crashed into a fence during a demonstration flight.

1909 
October 18 – Juvisy-sur-Orge, France – One spectator was killed and a dozen injured when an aircraft piloted by Alfred Leblanc lost control and crashed into the grandstands during an airshow.
September 9 – Gray, Haute-Saône, France – Five spectators were killed and two injured when an aircraft suddenly dropped into a crowd while flying over.
June 15 – Berwyn, Nebraska – Blacksmith and airplane builder Ulysses Sorenson escaped injury when his personally designed aircraft crashed on its test flight. Sorenson had the craft lifted to a height of 3,500 feet via a hot air balloon, before a crowd that had gathered, and when released the craft entered into what may have been a flat spin until it crashed to the ground.
31 May – Brownsville, Texas – Pilot Newman escaped injury when his aircraft went out of control and crashed while being towed on its maiden voyage.

1908
September 17 Fort Myer, Virginia – Pilot Orville Wright was injured and passenger Lieutenant Thomas Selfridge was killed when a propeller shattered causing their aircraft to crash from an approximate height of 75 feet in front of a crowd of two thousand.
August 13 – Le Mans, France – Pilot Wilbur Wright escaped injury when his aircraft crashed while attempting a power off, glide landing from a height of fifty feet.
2 May – Issy-les-Moulineaux, France – Pilot M. De Lagrange was uninjured when his aircraft swerved, missed a crowd of spectators, and crashed into an automobile.

1906
April 14 – Jacksonville, Florida – Pilot and aircraft builder Israel Ludlow was severely injured when his bamboo frame glider, that was being towed aloft by two automobiles, suffered structural failure at an approximate height of 200 feet.

1905
October 22 – Hudson River (Manhattan, New York) – Pilot and airplane builder Israel Ludlow escaped injury when his experimental glider aircraft crashed from a height of 400 feet into the Hudson River with thousands of spectators lining the riverbank. At the time the aircraft lacked an engine or steering and was being towed aloft by a tugboat which had stopped causing the aircraft to crash. 
July 18 – Santa Clara University (Santa Clara, California) – Pilot Daniel Maloney was killed when his aircraft, named the "Santa Clara", suffered structural collapse at a height of approximately 2,000 feet while a crowd of thousands watched.

1904
October 26 – St. Louis World's Fair (St. Louis, Missouri) – Pilot William Avery suffered minor injuries when his aircraft crash landed following a mechanical failure.

See also
List of air show accidents and incidents in the 21st century
List of accidents and incidents involving commercial aircraft
List of air shows
List of news aircraft accidents and incidents
Lists of accidents and incidents involving military aircraft

References

Airshow